M. Shanmugam is an Indian politician and Member of Parliament, Rajya Sabha from Tamil Nadu State.

He belongs to the DMK.

References 

21st-century Indian politicians
Rajya Sabha members from Tamil Nadu
Living people
Year of birth missing (living people)
Dravida Munnetra Kazhagam politicians